Victor L. Robles (born June 15, 1945) is an American politician from New York.

Biography
Robles was born on June 15, 1945, in Fajardo, Puerto Rico. He grew up in Williamsburg, Brooklyn, where he was raised by the Puerto Rican-American community activist Aurea M. Blanco. At a young age, he was asked by his mother to translate for her at neighborhood meetings and protests; through these activities, he caught the attention of former assemblyman and State Supreme Court Justice Gilbert Ramirez, who introduced him to Shirley Chisholm. He went on to work on Chisholm's staff, and entered politics as a Democrat.

Robles was a member of the New York State Assembly from 1979 to 1984, sitting in the 183rd, 184th and 185th New York State Legislatures. He was a member of the New York City Council from 1985 to 2001. In October 2001, he was elected by the City Council as City Clerk of New York. He remained in office until July 2007.

References

1945 births
Living people
American politicians of Puerto Rican descent
People from Fajardo, Puerto Rico
Politicians from Brooklyn
Hispanic and Latino American state legislators in New York (state)
New York City Council members
Hispanic and Latino American New York City Council members
Democratic Party members of the New York State Assembly
United States Army soldiers